The 2019–20 CSA Women's Provincial League was the 25th edition of South Africa's provincial one-day cricket tournament. It ran from October 2019 to March 2020, with 16 provincial teams taking part. The tournament was curtailed by the outbreak of the COVID-19 pandemic, with North West winning their third one-day title based on an adjusted points system.

Competition format
The 16 teams were divided into three divisions: a top division named "Top 6", and two lower divisions, Pools A and B. Teams in Pools A and B played each other team in their group once in a round-robin format, whilst teams in the Top 6 league played each other team in their group twice. Matches were played using a one day format, with 50 overs per side.

The winner of the Top 6 league was crowned the Champions. The bottom team in the Top 6 were relegated, with the best-performing team in Pools A and B promoted. Due to the COVID-19 pandemic, the final five matches in the Top 6 league were cancelled. The points given to each team were therefore adjusted to simulate an equal number of matches played. The tournament ran concurrently with the 2019–20 CSA Women's Provincial T20 Competition, with matches played either the day before or day after the corresponding encounter between two teams in the T20 tournament.

The groups worked on a points system with positions being based on the total points. Points were awarded as follows:

Win: 4 points 
Tie: 3 points 
Loss: 0 points.
Abandoned/No Result: 2 points.
Bonus Point: 1 bonus point available per match.

Teams

Tables

Top 6

Pool A

Pool B

References

CSA Women's Provincial Programme
Domestic cricket competitions in 2019–20
2019–20 South African cricket season
2019 in South African women's sport
2020 in South African women's sport
Cricket events curtailed due to the COVID-19 pandemic